Albert Pommer (1886 – 1946) was a German film producer. He was the elder brother of Erich Pommer, the head of the leading German studio UFA during the 1920s. Albert worked on a number of films distributed by UFA. He had earlier been appointed by his brother an executive of the newly formed Decla Film in 1915.

Selected filmography
 Revenge of the Bandits (1921)
 Parisian Women (1921)
 The Devil's Chains (1921)
 Lust for Life (1922)
 The Call of Destiny (1922)
 The Chain Clinks (1923)
 The Buddenbrooks (1923)
 The Other Woman (1924)
 Two and a Lady (1926)
 Two Under the Stars (1927)

References

Bibliography
 Hardt, Ursula. From Caligari to California: Erich Pommer's Life in the International Film Wars. Berghahn Books, 1996.

External links

1886 births
1946 deaths
German film producers
People from Hildesheim
Film people from Lower Saxony